Witherspoon Lodge No. 111 Free and Accepted Masons (F&AM) is a historic building located is at 1410 North Clayton Street in Mount Dora, Florida. The building was added to the U.S. National Register of Historic Places in 2009.

The building is named for Witherspoon Lodge, a Prince Hall tradition Masonic lodge chartered by the Union Grand Lodge of Florida, who purchased the building in 1903.  The building served as a meeting place for the lodge for many years, but as of 2013 the lodge is listed as inactive.

The building also served as a school for African-American children from 1922 to 1925.

It was built around 1921.

Gallery

References

Former Masonic buildings in Florida
National Register of Historic Places in Lake County, Florida
Defunct schools in Florida
Vernacular architecture in Florida
Clubhouses on the National Register of Historic Places in Florida
Mount Dora, Florida
Masonic buildings in Florida